ZALA 421-12 is a micro miniature UAV developed and produced by the Izhevsk-based company ZALA Aero. It is a small, portable and reliable UAV platform. ZALA 421-12 is designed for front-line reconnaissance, overground and oversea surveillance. It takes 3 minutes to prepare ZALA for launching. The UAV is operated in the autonomous or semi-autonomous mode.

Specifications 
Physical:

Takeoff weight, kg - 3,9;
Navigation - GPS;
Flight duration, h - 2;
Engine - electric;
Minimum speed, km/h. - 65; 
Maximum speed, km/h - 120 (limited by program);
Maximum flight altitude, m above the sea level - 3600;
Wingspan, m - 1,6;
Length, m - 0,62;
Wind speed during takeoff, no more than m/s - 10;
Payload weight, kg max - 1;
Launch - by means of catapult;
Landing - parachute.

Payload:
 Color Video camera  (550 TVL)
 Infrared camera (320*240 px)
 Photo camera (10 megapixels)

External links 
 zala.aero: Official site.

Unmanned aerial vehicles of Russia
421-12